Clontarf GAA is a Gaelic Athletic Association club based in Clontarf, Dublin, Ireland.

Notable players
Chris Barrett
Jack McCaffrey
Noel McCaffrey
Jim Ronayne

Honours
 Dublin AFL Div. 3 Winners 2014 
 Dublin AFL Div. 5 Winners 2018
 Dublin AFL Div. 6 Winners 2016
 Dublin AFL Div. 9 Winners 2019 
 Dublin AFL Div. 11 North Winners 2014
 Dublin Minor A Football Championship Winners 2016 
 Dublin Minor C Football Championship Winners 2007
 Dublin Under 21 B Football Championship: Winners 2018
 Dublin Junior B Hurling Championship Winners 2013
 Dublin Junior C Hurling Championship Winners 1999
 Dublin Junior E Hurling Championship Winners 2016
 Dublin Junior 6 Football Championship Winners 2020

References

External links
 
Dublin Club GAA

Clontarf, Dublin
Gaelic games clubs in Dublin (city)
Gaelic football clubs in Dublin (city)
Hurling clubs in Dublin (city)